Patkai Christian College is a college of higher education in Chümoukedima–Seithekema, Nagaland. It is rated highest by the National Assessment and Accreditation Council in the state of Nagaland, out of 11 colleges recognised by the University Grants Commission of India. It is rated with A grade for three consecutive assessments by NAAC and also with a status of CPE (College with potential for excellence).

The NAAC team re-accredited the institution in March 2010, giving it the A grade with a CGPA of 3.06.  In 2016, it is re-accredited with CGPA 3.26. Patkai Christian College was established in 1974 as a liberal Arts College.

History

Patkai, of which the Nagaland Baptist Church Council and Manipur Baptist Convention are major sponsors, was started in August 1974 with twenty students. However, the college is not a denominational institution, so the college receives financial assistance from several Christian denominational churches as well as independent churches and organizations. In late 1975, Patkai was provisionally affiliated to the North Eastern Hill University, Shillong.

The college offers various courses from all available art courses, social sciences, commerce, sciences, computer sciences, business administration, and music courses.

 1974 -  College started on 28 August
 1975 -  Provisional Affiliation with  NEHU
 1985   -  Honours programme in Political Science
 1986 -  Permanent Affiliation with NEHU
 1994 -  Affiliation transferred  to NU.
 1997   -  B.Sc. Programme
 2004   -  Accredited  B++ Grade by NAAC
 2005 -  Conferred  Autonomous Status by UGC
 2010 -  Reaccredited  'A' Grade with CGPA of 3.06 by NAAC
 2010   -  Conferred 'CPE (College with potential for excellence) Status' by UGC
 2011 -  Autonomy status extended for Second term till 2016-2017
 2012 -  Delinked Higher Secondary from Degree as per UGC Guidelines.
 2013  -  M.Sc.in  Environmental Science

-  M.A. in  English

-  Recognized as ‘PG College’ by UGC

-  UGC approved Certificate Course in Music

-  UGC approved Certificate Course in Applied Electronics and Computer Hardwares

-  UGC approved Certificate Course  in IT

-  Certificate Course in Communication Skills for M.A. in English

-  Diploma in Computer Applications for M. Sc. Env. Sc.

2014  -  Diploma in Computer Applications
–Bachelor of Music

-  Diploma in IT

-  Certificate in Counselling

- M.Sc. in Geology

 2016 -  Re-accredited with CGPA 3.26  by NAAC. First college in Nagaland to adopt the Choice-based credit system (CBCS)  as per UGC guideline
 2019 - M.A. in Political Science

Programmes offered

Undergraduate programmes
Bachelor of Arts
 Economics
 Education
English
History
Political Science
Philosophy
Bachelor of Science 
Botany
Chemistry
Geology
Mathematics
Physics
Zoology
Computer Science
Bachelor of Commerce
Bachelor of Computer Applications
Bachelor of Music

Postgraduate  programmes
M. A. in English 
M. A. in Political Science
M. Sc. In Environmental Science
M. Sc. Geology
M. Sc. Botany
M. Sc. Zoology
M. Sc. Chemistry 
M. Sc. Physics

References

External links
 NAAC report
 Official Website
 The Facebook group for Patkai Ch. College

Universities and colleges in Nagaland
Colleges affiliated to Nagaland University
Chümoukedima
Educational institutions established in 1974
1974 establishments in Nagaland